Caparaó National Park is a national park created in 1961 to protect the Caparaó Mountains, located on the border between Minas Gerais and Espírito Santo states in Brazil. Pico da Bandeira, one of the highest mountains in Brazil, is located there.

Location

The park was created by decree No. 50146 of 24 May 1961.
The purpose was to protect the natural resources and support ecotourism activities.
The park lies in the Serra do Caparaó on the border between the states of Minas Gerais and Espírito Santo.
It includes parts of the municipalities of Alto Caparaó, Alto Jequitibá, Caparaó and Espera Feliz in Minas Gerais, and of Dores do Rio Preto, Divino de São Lourenço, Ibitirama, Iúna and Irupi in Espírito Santo.
It became part of the Central Atlantic Forest Ecological Corridor, created in 2002.

The park contains the third highest peak in Brazil, the  Pico da Bandeira.
It protects the watersheds of the Itabapoana, Itapemirim and Doce rivers.

Biota

The Serra do Caparaó has a very representative area of Atlantic Forest, with unique examples of alpine meadows.
The park has several species of endemic and endangered flora and fauna.
On the east side in the state of Espírito Santo the vegetation is mainly tropical rainforest.
Plants at higher regions are adapted to stony soils, frost and ice crusts.

Fauna has suffered from hunting, but the park is still home to endangered species such as southern muriqui (Brachyteles arachnoides), maned wolf (Chrysocyon brachyurus) and pampas deer (Ozotocerus bezoarticus).
The park also includes species such as the jaguar, tapir, harpy eagle, black-fronted piping guan (Pipile jacutinga) and solitary tinamou (Tinamus solitarius).

Facilities

There is an entrance to the park in the municipality of Alto Caparaó, Minas Gerais, where the park headquarters are, and in the municipality of Dores do Rio Preto, Espírito Santo.
The Minas Gerais entrance was inaugurated in September 1998.
The visitor centre has space for exhibitions, and auditorium with capacity for 64 people, toilets, a souvenir shop and snack bar.
Access to the park is controlled.
Visitors may not bring domestic animals, hunting or fishing equipment, may not collect plants, fruit, animals or stones, and may not use two-wheeled vehicles.
There is an extensive network of hiking trails and four camping area for visitors with bathrooms and other facilities.

Notes

Sources

National parks of Brazil
Protected areas of Minas Gerais
Protected areas of Espírito Santo
Protected areas of the Atlantic Forest